The 1887 Atlantic hurricane season was the most active Atlantic hurricane season on record at the time in terms of number of known tropical storms formed, with 19. This total has since been equaled by 1995, 2010, 2011, and 2012. Four seasons have had more storms: 1933 (20), 2021 (21), 2005 (28), and 2020 (30). The 1887 season featured five off-season storms, with tropical activity occurring as early as May, and as late as December. It is also worthy of note that the volume of recorded activity was documented largely without the benefit of modern technology. Tropical cyclones during this era that did not approach populated areas or shipping lanes, especially if they were relatively weak and of short duration, may have remained undetected. Because technologies such as satellite monitoring were not available until the 1960s, historical data on tropical cyclones from this period may not be comprehensive. An undercount bias of zero to six tropical cyclones per year between 1851 and 1885 and zero to four per year between 1886 and 1910 has been estimated. Of the known 1887 cyclones, Tropical Storm One and Tropical Storm Three were first documented in 1996 by Jose Fernandez-Partagas and Henry Diaz. They also proposed large alterations to the known tracks of several of the other 1887 storms. Later re-analysis led to the known duration of Hurricane Six, and also that of Hurricane Fifteen, being increased.

Eleven of the season's nineteen known storms attained hurricane status. Only a few of the storms during the 1887 season did not impact land, but there was a low number of deaths.

Timeline

Systems

Tropical Storm One 

The first storm of the season formed south of Bermuda on May 15, outside of the season boundaries and moved to the northwest, staying out to sea. After peaking at  late the next day, it turned northward, and became extratropical on May 18 over Newfoundland.

Tropical Storm Two 

Another May storm formed south of Jamaica on May 17, way outside of the season and moved generally northward. It crossed Cuba on May 19 as a tropical storm, and moved out to sea. Two peaked at 60 mph (95 km/h) twice, once on May 18 and May 20. Two dissipated on May 21 in the Atlantic Ocean. When this storm and the first storm were active simultaneously from May 17 to May 18, it became the earliest for two storms to be active at one time.

Tropical Storm Three 

A weak tropical storm, which began its life in the northwest Caribbean Sea on June 12. Three peaked at 40 mph (65 km/h) and moved northward through the Gulf of Mexico, and dissipated on June 14 after making landfall in Mississippi. It caused "some" loss of life.

Hurricane Four 

On July 20 a tropical storm formed 150 miles southeast of Barbados. The next day it passed south of the island as a Category 1 hurricane and caused several vessels to be wrecked or to be run aground there.
Although the hurricane passed far to the south of Cuba, it caused several vessels to sink at Batabanó and brought heavy rain and flooding to the islands interior. Continuing westward, the hurricane passed over the eastern tip of the Yucatán Peninsula before first turning northward and then northeasterly. It made landfall on the Florida panhandle on the morning of July 27 as a Category 1 hurricane, with a wind speed of 85 mph (140 km/h). The storm continued northward, as a tropical storm, before dissipating late on July 28 near Augusta, Georgia. The cyclone caused extensive damage to the cotton crop throughout Georgia and Alabama.

Tropical Storm Five 

Hurricane Six 

The season's first of two major hurricanes, both following a very similar Cape Verde-type hurricane path in mid-August, but remained offshore. Six formed on August 14 in the middle of the Atlantic Ocean. Six started moving toward the Carolina coast and moved far north and peaked as a  & 967 mbar major hurricane on August 20, when rapid weakening began. Six was declared extratropical two days later.

Hurricane Seven 

The season's second of two major hurricanes, both following a very similar Cape Verde-type hurricane path in mid-August, but remained offshore. Seven formed from a depression on August 18 into Tropical Storm Seven and followed the same track as Six. Seven peaked at 125 mph (205 km/h) winds for three straight days as a major hurricane and rapid weakening began. Seven was declared extratropical on August 27.

Hurricane Eight 

On September 1, a tropical storm formed in the central Atlantic Ocean. It moved northwestward, becoming a hurricane on September 2. The extratropical storm remained until September 6, when it dissipated off the coast of Ireland.

Hurricane Nine 

A hurricane, which was first observed on September 11 to the east of the Lesser Antilles, traversed the Caribbean Sea, remaining away from land until hitting extreme northeast Yucatán Peninsula on September 17. It moved across the Gulf of Mexico, and weakened slightly before landfall as it hit near Brownsville, Texas, on September 21 as an 85 mph (140 km/h) hurricane. The storm rapidly weakened over Texas and northeast Mexico, and dissipated on the 22nd.

Thirty-six hours of rainfall flooded low-lying areas and fourteen sailors were lost at sea.

Hurricane Ten 

On September 14, the tenth storm formed in the central Atlantic Ocean and moved northward. It started losing its tropical characteristics while northeast of Newfoundland on September 18 and was soon declared as an extratropical storm.

Tropical Storm Eleven 

The eleventh tropical storm of the season developed in the western Caribbean Sea on October 6. The storm peaked at 60 mph (95 km/h), then started moving westward through the Yucatán Peninsula and Bay of Campeche. Eleven dissipated on October 9 after making its second landfall in Mexico.

Tropical Storm Twelve 

A depression strengthened into Tropical Storm Twelve on October 8 and peaked at  winds later that day. After passing over Bermuda, Twelve dissipated the next day. Twelve was the shortest lived storm in the 1887 season lasting only two days (October 8 & 9th).

Hurricane Thirteen 

A tropical storm was first seen on October 9 to the northeast of the Lesser Antilles. It moved westward to cross Puerto Rico and Hispaniola, before strengthening into a hurricane while south of Cuba on October 12. It struck the Louisiana coast near New Orleans on October 19 as a tropical storm. Considerable damage and some flooding were seen in New Orleans, trees were blown down in Algiers and there were significant amounts of crop damage in Abbeville and Iberville Parish. The storm swept across Georgia and the Carolinas before becoming dissipating at sea early on October 20.

Around October 14, a storm moved over Belize, causing moderate crop damage and disruption in the southern part of the country. Because the 13th storm of the season existed at the same time to its northeast, this system was not included, though further research is under way to determine if it was a new storm or a variation of the 13th storm of the season.

Hurricane Fourteen 

On October 10, a depression strengthened into Tropical Storm Fourteen and moved across the ocean. Fourteen peaked with 85 mph (140 km/h) winds as a Category 1 hurricane on October 11. On October 12, Fourteen weakened and was declared extratropical.

Hurricane Fifteen 

The storm remained out at sea and gradually weakened until dissipating on October 19th.

Tropical Storm Sixteen 

A tropical storm formed on October 27 and took a long, erratic track across the Caribbean Sea and the Atlantic Ocean. Sixteen made landfall and moved across Florida as a tropical storm on October 30. Sixteen paralleled the Carolina coastline and peaked at a  storm with a tropical pressure of 993 mbar on October 31. The storm dissipated on November 6. Sixteen caused a ship to capsize, killing two sailors, and resulted in the loss of four other ships.

Hurricane Seventeen 

On November 27, a tropical storm formed north of Puerto Rico. It moved to the west-northwest, and looped to the northeast. The storm was last seen on December 4 in the open Atlantic Ocean.

Hurricane Eighteen 

The 18th storm was first seen to the northeast of the Lesser Antilles on December 4. It moved northwestward at first, then turned to the northeast, strengthening into a hurricane on December 7 before rapid weakening began and Eighteen was declared an extratropical storm on December 9.

Tropical Storm Nineteen 

The 19th and final tropical storm formed on December 7 and moved westward through the Caribbean Sea. Nineteen peaked in intensity on December 10 with 60 mph (95 km/h) winds. Nineteen passed by St. Vincent and continued westward until dissipating near the coast of Costa Rica on December 12. When Tropical Storm Nineteen formed on December 7, it made 1887 the year with the most off-season storms (five).

At the time, Nineteen was the only tropical storm to pass over Costa Rica on record. In 2016, Hurricane Otto passed over Costa Rica as a minimal hurricane. However, prior to doing this Otto made landfall in extreme southern Nicaragua. Nineteen was the only tropical storm to make landfall until Tropical Storm Bonnie in 2022, which made landfall barely south of the Costa Rica-Nicaragua border.

See also 

 Atlantic hurricane season
 Tropical cyclone observation
 Atlantic hurricane reanalysis project

References

External links 
 Monthly Weather Review
 Unisys Data for 1887 Atlantic Hurricane Season
 HURDAT Data for the 1887 Atlantic hurricane season

Hurricanes in Costa Rica
 
Articles which contain graphical timelines
1887 natural disasters
1887 meteorology